Barton is a small village in the county of Lancashire, England. The village lies within the civil parish of Downholland.

Barton's listing in the 1086 Domesday Book shows Roger the Poitevin as lord and Tenant-in-chief. At the time Barton was in the Hundred of West Derby in the county of Cheshire.

The Manor of Barton was held by the Clifton family and, from about 1212, by the Barton family. The last Barton heiress, Fleetwood Barton (1595-1664) married into the Shuttleworth family (her first marriage to Viscount Molyneux was annulled). Her husband, Richard Shuttleworth of Gawthorpe Hall, supported the Parliamentary side in the English Civil War. The Shuttleworths held the manor until 1833, when it was sold to the Preston industrialist, George Jacson.

The village had its own Barton railway station, which opened in 1887. The line was closed completely in 1952.

See also
Listed buildings in Downholland

References

External links

Villages in Lancashire
Geography of the Borough of West Lancashire